Casa Blanca is a pre-Columbian Maya archeological site in Chalchuapa, El Salvador. The site possesses several pyramids dating to the Late Preclassic period (500 BC – AD 250) and the Classic period (AD 250–900). This ruin is part of the Chalchuapa archaeological zone and displays influences from the Olmecs and from Teotihuacan. It is closely related to the ruins of Tazumal and San Andrés. The government purchased the park in 1977 and it was given the name of the coffee plantation upon which it was situated. There are many pyramids at Casa Blanca but only two have been partially restored. Casa Blanca is located in the department of Santa Ana. Casa Blanca has been closed to the public and is undergoing restoration work; it has a site museum with exhibits that include Maya ceramics and other artifacts.

References

Further reading

Maya sites in El Salvador
Olmec sites
Former populated places in El Salvador
Archaeological sites in El Salvador
Pyramids in El Salvador
Santa Ana Department